Napoleon Alphonseau Chagnon (27 August 1938 – 21 September 2019) was an American cultural anthropologist, professor of sociocultural anthropology at the University of Missouri in Columbia and member of the National Academy of Sciences. Chagnon was known for his long-term ethnographic field work among the Yanomamö, a society of indigenous tribal Amazonians, in which he used an evolutionary approach to understand social behavior in terms of genetic relatedness. His work centered on the analysis of violence among tribal peoples, and, using socio-biological analyses, he advanced the argument that violence among the Yanomami is fueled by an evolutionary process in which successful warriors have more offspring. His 1967 ethnography Yanomamö: The Fierce People became a bestseller and is frequently assigned in introductory anthropology courses.

Admirers described him as a pioneer of scientific anthropology. Chagnon was called the "most controversial anthropologist" in the United States in a New York Times Magazine profile preceding the publication of Chagnon's most recent book, Noble Savages: My Life Among Two Dangerous Tribes—the Yanomamö and the Anthropologists, a memoir.

Early life and education
Chagnon was born in Port Austin, Michigan, and was the second of twelve children. After enrolling at the Michigan College of Mining and Technology in 1957, he transferred to the University of Michigan after his first year and there received a bachelor's degree in 1961, an M.A. in 1963, and a PhD in 1966 under the tutelage of Leslie White. Based on seventeen months of fieldwork begun in 1964, Chagnon's thesis examined the relationship between kinship and the social organization of Yanomamö villages.

Career
Chagnon was best known for his long-term ethnographic field work among the Yanomamö, indigenous Amazonians who live in the border area between Venezuela and Brazil. Working primarily in the headwaters of the upper Siapa and upper Mavaca Rivers in Venezuela, he conducted fieldwork from the mid-1960s until the latter half of the 1990s. According to Chagnon, when he arrived he realised that the theories he had been taught during his training had shortcomings, because contrary to what they predicted, raiding and fighting, often over women, was endemic. Due to his constantly asking questions, Chagnon was nicknamed "pesky bee" by the Yanomamö. A major focus of his research was the collection of genealogies of the residents of the villages that he visited, and from these he would analyze patterns of relatedness, marriage patterns, cooperation, and settlement pattern histories. The degree of kinship was seen by Chagnon as important for the forming of alliances in social interactions, including conflict.

Chagnon's methods of analysis are widely seen as having been influenced by sociobiology. As Chagnon described it, Yanomamö society produced fierceness, because that behavior furthered male reproductive success. The genealogies showed that men who killed had more wives and children than men who did not kill. At the level of the villages, the war-like populations expanded at the expense of their neighbors. Chagnon's positing of a link between reproductive success and violence cast doubt on the sociocultural perspective that cultures are constructed from human experience. An enduring controversy over Chagnon's work has been described as a microcosm of the conflict between biological and sociocultural anthropology.

Chagnon's ethnography, Yanomamö: The Fierce People, was published in 1968 and ran to several editions, selling nearly a million copies,. It is commonly used as a text in university-level introductory anthropology classes, making it one of the bestselling anthropological texts of all time. Chagnon was also a pioneer in the field of visual anthropology. He collaborated with ethnographic filmmaker Tim Asch and produced a series of more than twenty ethnographic films documenting Yanomamö life. The ethnographic film The Ax Fight, showing a fight among two Yanomami groups and analyzing it as it relates to kinship networks, is considered a classic in ethnographic film making.

In 2012 he was elected to the National Academy of Sciences. Marshall Sahlins, who was a major critic of Chagnon, resigned from the academy, citing Chagnon's induction as one of the reasons he quit.

On 21 September 2019, Chagnon died at the age of 81.

Controversies

Darkness in El Dorado
In 2000, Patrick Tierney, in his book Darkness in El Dorado, accused Chagnon and his colleague James V. Neel, among other things, of exacerbating a measles epidemic among the Yanomamö people. 

Most of the allegations made in Darkness in El Dorado were publicly rejected by the Provost's office of the University of Michigan in November 2000. For example, the interviews upon which the book was based all came from members of the Salesians of Don Bosco, a congregation of the Catholic Church, which Chagnon had criticized and angered.

The  American Anthropological Association convened a task force in February 2001 to investigate some of the allegations made in Tierney's book. Their report, which was issued by the AAA in May 2002, held that Chagnon had both represented the Yanomamö in harmful ways and failed in some instances to obtain proper consent from both the government and the groups he studied. However, the Task Force stated that there was no support to the claim that Chagnon and Neel began a measles epidemic. In June 2005, however, the AAA voted over two-to-one to rescind the acceptance of the 2002 report.

Alice Dreger, an historian of medicine and science, concluded after a year of research that Tierney's claims were false and the American Anthropological Association was complicit and irresponsible in helping spread these falsehoods and not protecting "scholars from baseless and sensationalistic charges".

The controversy is covered in the 2005 book Yanomami: The Fierce Controversy and What We Can Learn from It by anthropologist Robert Borofsky.

Anthropological critiques of his work
Chagnon's work with the Yanomamö was widely criticized by other anthropologists. Anthropologists critiqued both aspects of his research methods as well as the theoretical approach, and the interpretations and conclusions he drew from his data. Most controversial was his claim that Yanomamö society is particularly violent, and his claim that this feature of their culture is grounded in biological differences that are the result of natural selection.

The anthropologist Brian Ferguson argued that Yanomamö culture is not particularly violent, and that the violence that does exist is largely a result of socio-political reconfigurations of their society under the influence of colonization. Bruce Albert rejected the statistical basis for his claims that more violent Yanomamö men have more children. Others questioned the ethics inherent in painting an ethnic group as violent savages, pointing out that Chagnon's depiction of the Yanomamö as such breaks with anthropology's traditional ethics of trying to describe foreign societies sympathetically, and argued that his depictions resulted in increased hostility and racism against the Yanomamö by settlers and colonists in the area. Emily Eakin countered that Albert "cannot demonstrate a direct connection between Chagnon’s writings and the government’s Indian policy" and that the idea that scientists should suppress unflattering information about their subjects is troubling and supports the idea that nonviolence is a prerequisite for protecting the Yanomamö.

The anthropologist Marshall Sahlins, one of Chagnon's graduate teachers, criticized Chagnon's methods, pointing out that Chagnon acknowledged engaging in behavior that was disagreeable to his informants by not participating in food-sharing obligations. Sahlins claimed that Chagnon's trade of steel weaponry for blood samples and genealogical information amounted to "participant-instigation" which encouraged economic competition and violence. Lastly, Sahlins argued that Chagnon's publications, which contend that violent Yanomamö men are conferred with reproductive advantages, made false assumptions in designating killers and omit other variables that explain reproductive success. In 2013, Sahlins resigned from the National Academy of Sciences, in part in protest of Chagnon's election to the body. Other researchers of the Yanomamö such as Brian Ferguson argued that Chagnon himself contributed to escalating violence among the Yanomamö by offering machetes, axes, and shotguns to selected groups to elicit their cooperation. Chagnon said that it was instead local Salesian priests who were supplying guns to the Yanomamö who then used them to kill each other.

In his autobiography, Chagnon stated that most criticisms of his work were based on a postmodern and antiscientific ideology that arose within anthropology, in which careful study of isolated tribes was replaced in many cases by explicit political advocacy that denied less pleasant aspects of the Yanomamö culture, such as warfare, domestic violence, and infanticide. Chagnon stated that much of his work has undermined the idea of the 'Noble savage' – a romanticized stereotype of indigenous people living in synchrony with nature and uncorrupted by modern civilization. Chagnon also stated that his beliefs about sociobiology and kin selection were misinterpreted and misunderstood, similarly due to a rejection of scientific and biological explanations for culture within anthropology.

As a result of the controversy and the alleged unethical practices with the Yanomami, Chagnon was officially barred from studying the Yanomami and from reentering their country in Venezuela.

Written works

Books

 .
 .
 .
 .

Book chapters

Journal articles

Film
Chagnon worked with ethnographic filmmaker Tim Asch to produce at least forty films on Yanomamo culture, including The Feast (1969), Magical Death (1973) and The Ax Fight (1975). These films, especially The Ax Fight, are widely used in anthropological and visual culture curriculum and are considered to be among the most important ethnographic films ever produced.

See also
 Visual anthropology
 The Trap (television documentary series); Chagnon features in The Trap, a BBC documentary.

References
Notes

Bibliography

External links

 Brockmann, John. "Edge Special Event feat. Napoleon Chagnon", Edge.org, 6 June 2013.
 Grossman, Andrew. "Napoleon Chagnon's Waterloo", The Dartmouth Review, 30 October 2000.
 Wallace, Scott. "Napoleon in Exile", National Geographic Adventure Magazine, April 2002.
 

1938 births
2019 deaths
University of Michigan alumni
American anthropologists
University of California, Santa Barbara faculty
University of Missouri faculty
Members of the United States National Academy of Sciences